The Varvakeio High School is a public Greek junior high school and high school  located in Psychiko. It was founded by Ioannis Varvakis, who donated a big part of his fortune to the state, in order to build a public, fee-less high school. The realization of Varvakis' dream came true after his death as the building was opened in 1860, initially across from the present-day Varvakios Agora (central market). Badly damaged in the civil war, the original Panagis Kalkos-designed building was demolished in 1955 or 1956. The school moved several times before settling on its current location in Psychiko in 1983. Originally all-male, the school became co-ed in 1979.

Notable alumni
The Varvakeio High School has produced, over the years, notable alumni in varied fields. Some of them include:

Arts and literature 
 Freddy Germanos, actor
 Georgios Drosinis, poet
 Dimitri Mitropoulos, composer and pianist
 Alexandros Papadiamantis, novelist and poet
 Antonis Samarakis, writer

Economics and politics 
 Evangelos Averoff, former President of New Democracy party and Minister
 Leonidas Kouris, former Mayor of Athens
 Theodoros Pangalos, current Member of the Hellenic Parliament
 Alexandros Papagos, former Prime Minister of Greece
 Dimitrios Papadimoulis, current Vice-President of the European Parliament
 Yagos Pesmazoglou, former economist, Member of the Hellenic Parliament and MEP
 Konstantinos Tsatsos, former diplomat and President of the Hellenic Republic 
 Nikolaos Vettas, AUEB professor of Economics

Science 
 Constantinos Daskalakis, MIT professor of computer science (1999 alumnus)
 Constantinos Apostolou Doxiadis, architect
 Christos Papakyriakopoulos, mathematician
 Mihalis Yannakakis, Columbia University professor of computer science

Other
Kostas Axelos, philosopher
Saint Nectarios of Aegina
Michael Stathopoulos, former UoA Professor of Law and member of the Greek Academy

See also 
 Varvakeion Athena, a statue found near the original (demolished) site of the school

References

External links
  
Website of the Varvakeio Alumni Association 

Schools in Greece
Education in Athens
1860 establishments in Greece